Tropidophis pilsbryi, commonly known as Pilsbry's dwarf boa or the Cuban white-necked dwarf boa, is a species of snake in the family Tropidophiidae. The species is endemic to Cuba.

Etymology
Both the specific name, pilsbryi, and one of the common names, Pilsbry's dwarf boa, are in honor of American malacologist Henry Augustus Pilsbry.

Subspecies
Two subspecies are recognized, including the nominate subspecies:
Tropidophis pilsbryi pilsbryi Bailey, 1937 – eastern Cuba
Tropidophis pilsbryi galacelidus Schwartz & Garrido, 1975 – central Cuba

Taxonomy
In 2002 Hedges elevated the subspecies T. p. galacelidus to a full species, T. galacelidus.

Description

Reproduction
T. pilsbryi is viviparous.

References

Further reading
Bailey JR (1937). "A review of some recent Tropidophis material". Proc. New England Zoöl. Club 16: 41–52. (Tropidophis maculatus pilsbryi, new subspecies, p. 42).
Hedges SB (2002). "Morphological variation and the definition of species in the snake genus Tropidophis (Serpentes: Tropidophiidae) from eastern Cuba". Bull. Nat. Hist. Mus. London (Zool.) '68 (2): 83–90.
Schwartz A, Henderson RW (1991). Amphibians and Reptiles of the West Indies: Descriptions, Distributions, and Natural History. Gainesville, Florida: University of Florida Press. 714 pp. . (Tropidophis pilsbryi, p. 641).
Schwartz A, Thomas R (1975). A Check-list of West Indian Amphibians and Reptiles. Carnegie Museum of Natural History Special Publication No. 1. Pittsburgh, Pennsylvania: Carnegie Museum of Natural History. 216 pp. (Tropidophis pilsbryi'', p. 195).

Tropidophiidae
Endemic fauna of Cuba
Reptiles of Cuba
Reptiles described in 1937
Snakes of the Caribbean